USC Trojans basketball may refer to either of the basketball teams that represent the University of Southern California:

USC Trojans men's basketball
USC Trojans women's basketball